Events of the year 1610 in France.

Incumbents 
Monarch: Henry IV (until 14 May), then Louis XIII
Regent: Marie de' Medici (from 14 May)

Events
May 13 – Marie de' Medici is crowned Queen of France at the Basilica of Saint-Denis.
May 14 – Henry IV, King of France, is fatally stabbed by François Ravaillac during a parade marking the recent coronation of his wife; he is succeeded by his 8-year-old son Louis.
May 15 – By the first lit de justice of Louis XIII, his mother Marie de' Medici is proclaimed regent of France.
May 27 – Regicide François Ravaillac is executed by being pulled apart by horses in the Place de Grève, Paris.
October 17 – Louis XIII is crowned King of France at Reims Cathedral.

Births
 February 2 – Pierre Bourdelot, physician, anatomist, freethinker, abbé and libertine (died 1685)
 February 13 – Jean de Labadie, mystic (died 1674)
 April 1 – Charles de Saint-Évremond, soldier and writer (died 1703)
 By July 10 – Louis Maimbourg, Jesuit historian (died 1686)
 October 6 – Charles de Sainte-Maure, duc de Montausier, soldier (died 1690)
 François Eudes de Mézeray, historian (died 1683)
 Abraham Duquesne, naval officer (died 1688)
 Marie Meurdrac, chemist and alchemist (died 1680)

Deaths
 January 1 – François Feuardent, theologian (born 1539)
 February 27 – Philippe Canaye, diplomat (born 1551)
 May 14 – King Henry IV of France, assassinated (born 1553)
 May 27 – François Ravaillac, assassin of Henry IV, executed (born 1578)

References

1610s in France